Windy Hills is a home rule-class city, incorporated in 1952, in eastern Jefferson County, Kentucky, United States. The population was 2,385 at the 2010 census.

Geography
It is bordered to the north by Indian Hills, at its northernmost point by Northfield, to the east by Graymoor-Devondale, to the south by Woodlawn Park and St. Matthews, to the southwest by Maryhill Estates, and otherwise by consolidated Louisville/Jefferson County. U.S. Route 42 forms the northern border of the city, and Interstate 264 forms the eastern border.

The Muddy Fork of Beargrass Creek, a tributary of the Ohio River, rises in the northeastern quarter of the city and flows westerly towards Hubbards Lane.

Demographics

As of the census of 2000, there were 2,480 people, 1,076 households, and 747 families residing in the city. The racial makeup of the city was 96.49% White, 2.14% African American, 0.04% Native American, 0.81% Asian, 0.04% from other races, and 0.48% from two or more races. Hispanic or Latino of any race were 0.52% of the population.

There were 1,076 households, out of which 25.8% had children under the age of 18 living with them, 61.3% were married couples living together, 6.2% had a female householder with no husband present, and 30.5% were non-families. 28.3% of all households were made up of individuals, and 17.7% had someone living alone who was 65 years of age or older. The average household size was 2.30 and the average family size was 2.83.

In the city, the population was spread out, with 20.8% under the age of 18, 4.5% from 18 to 24, 19.8% from 25 to 44, 30.0% from 45 to 64, and 24.9% who were 65 years of age or older. The median age was 47 years. For every 100 females, there were 83.3 males. For every 100 females age 18 and over, there were 80.1 males.

The median income for a household in the city was $66,905, and the median income for a family was $73,500. Males had a median income of $55,952 versus $37,083 for females. The per capita income for the city was $34,509. About 2.9% of families and 3.0% of the population were below the poverty line, including 4.1% of those under age 18 and 2.2% of those age 65 or over.

References

External links
City of Windy Hills official website

Cities in Jefferson County, Kentucky
Cities in Kentucky
Louisville metropolitan area